Robert B. Capron Jr. (born July 9, 1998) is an American actor. He is best known for starring as Rowley Jefferson, Greg Heffley's best friend, in the first three installments of the Diary of a Wimpy Kid film series. More recently, he is known for starring as Mason in the drama series Elementary, and as David Lewan in the film The Polka King.

Career
He started off with a role in Bride Wars, and later had small parts in Hachiko: A Dog's Story and the film by Disney, The Sorcerer's Apprentice. His mother, Kaye Capron, played his character's mother in Diary of a Wimpy Kid. Capron is from Scituate, Rhode Island, and has also been billed as Robert B. Capron. He  graduated Brown University in 2020 with a bachelor's degree in modern culture and media/history.

Filmography

Awards and nominations

References

External links
 
 

1998 births
Living people
21st-century American comedians
21st-century American male actors
Actors from Providence, Rhode Island
American male child actors
American male comedians
American male film actors
American male television actors
American male voice actors
American stand-up comedians
Comedians from Rhode Island
Male actors from Rhode Island

Brown University alumni